Festuca arundinacea (syn., Schedonorus arundinaceus and Lolium arundinaceum) is a species of grass commonly known as tall fescue. It is a cool-season perennial C3 species of bunchgrass native to Europe.  It is an important forage grass throughout Europe, and many cultivars have been used in agriculture. It is also an ornamental grass in gardens, and a phytoremediation plant.

The predominant cultivar found in British pastures is S170, an endophyte-free variety. In its native European environment, tall fescue is found in damp grasslands, river banks, and in coastal seashore locations.  Its distribution is a factor of climatic, edaphic, or other environmental attributes. In New Zealand, where it is introduced, the species is particularly prolific in salt marshes, where it is often a major part of the plant biota.

History
Festuca arundinacea was originally developed in Kew Gardens in the United Kingdom.

In the U.S.
Tall fescue was introduced into the United States in the late 19th century, but it did not establish itself as a widely used perennial forage until the 1940s. As in Europe, tall fescue has become an important, well-adapted cool season forage grass for agriculture in the US with many cultivars. In addition to forage, it has become an important grass for turf and soil conservation. Tall fescue is the most heat tolerant of the major cool season grasses. Tall fescue has a deep root system compared to other cool season grasses.

Tall fescue has become an invasive species and noxious weed in native California grasslands and habitats, such as the California coastal prairie plant community.

The dominant cultivar grown in the United States is Kentucky 31.  In 1931 E. N. Fergus, a professor of agronomy at the University of Kentucky, collected seed from a population on a hillside in Menifee County, Kentucky although formal cultivar release did not happen until 1943.  Fergus heard about this "wonder grass" while judging a sorghum syrup competition in a nearby town. He wanted to see this grass because it was green, lush, and growing well on a sloped hillside during a drought.  While visiting the site he was impressed and took seed samples with him.  With this seed he conducted variety trials, initiated seed increase nurseries, and lauded its performance.  It was released as Kentucky 31 in 1943 and today it dominates grasslands in the humid southeastern US.  In 1943, Fergus and others recognized this tall fescue cultivar as being vigorous, widely adaptable, able to withstand poor soil conditions, resistant to pests and drought. It is used primarily in pastures and low maintenance situations.

Breeders have created numerous cultivars that are dark green with desirable narrower blades than the light green coarse bladed K-31. Tall fescue is the grass on the South Lawn of the White House.

Description
Tall fescue is a long-lived perennial bunchgrass species. Photosynthesis occurs throughout the leaves, which form bunches and are thick and wide with prominent veins running parallel the entire length of the blade. The blades have a "toothed" edge which can be felt if fingers are run down the edge of the leaf blade. The underside of the leaf may be shiny. Emerging leaves are rolled in the bud with no prominent ligule. Note that most grasses are folded not rolled, which make this a key identification feature on tall fescue. The auricles are usually blunt but occasionally may be more clawlike. The culm is round in cross-section.

Tall fescue spreads through tillering and seed transmission — not by stolons or rhizomes, which are common in many grass species.  However, tall fescue may have numerous sterile shoots that extend the width of each bunch.  There are approximately 227,000 seeds per pound.

Typically found across the mid-Atlantic and Southeast US, tall fescue performs best in soils with pH values between 5.5 and 7.  Growth may occur year-round if conditions are adequate, but typically growth ceases when soil temperature falls below .

Taxonomy
Festuca arundinacea was first described by the German naturalist Johann Christian Daniel von Schreber in 1771. It was later moved to the genus Schedonorus by the Belgian botanist Barthélemy Charles Joseph Dumortier in 1824 and again to the genus Lolium under the name Lolium arundinaceum by Stephen J. Darbyshire in 1993. The genus Schedonorus was resurrected in 1998 and the name Schedonorus arundinaceus (Schreb.) Dumort. was conserved against the earlier name Schedonorus arundinaceus Roem. & Schult. Best known by the name Festuca arundinacea, there is disagreement by taxonomists whether Festuca subgenus Schedonorus is allied more with the genus Lolium or best elevated to genus rank on its own.

Endophyte association

Tall fescue can be found growing in most soils of the southeast including marginal, acidic, and poorly drained soils and in areas of low fertility, and where stresses occur due to drought and overgrazing.  These beneficial attributes are now known to be a result of a symbiotic association with the fungus Neotyphodium coenophialum.

This association between tall fescue and the fungal endophyte is a mutualistic symbiotic relationship (both symbionts derive benefits from it).  The fungus remains completely intercellular, growing between the cells of the aboveground parts of its grass host. The fungus is asexual, and is transmitted to new generations of tall fescue only through seed, a mode known as vertical transmission. Thus in nature, the fungus does not live outside the plant. Viability of the fungus in seeds is limited; typically, after a year or two of seed storage the fungal endophyte mycelium has died, and seeds germinated will result in plants that are endophyte-free.

The tall fescue–endophyte symbiosis confers a competitive advantage to the plant.  Endophyte-infected tall fescue compared to endophyte-free tall fescue deters herbivory by insects and mammals, bestows drought resistance, and disease resistance. In return for shelter, seed transmission, and nutrients the endophyte produces secondary metabolites. These metabolites, namely alkaloids, are responsible for increased plant fitness.  Alkaloids in endophytic tall fescue include 1-aminopyrrolizidines (lolines), ergot alkaloids (clavines, lysergic acids, and derivative alkaloids), and the pyrrolopyrazine, peramine.

The lolines are the most abundant alkaloids, with concentrations 1000 higher than those of ergot alkaloids.  Endophyte-free grasses do not produce lolines, and, as shown for the closely related endophyte commonly occurring in meadow fescue, Neotyphodium uncinatum, the endophyte can produce lolines in axenic laboratory culture. However, although N. coenophialum possesses all the genes for loline biosynthesis, it does not produce lolines in culture. So in the tall fescue symbiosis, only the interaction of the host and endophyte produces the lolines. Lolines have been shown to deter insect herbivory, and may cause various other responses in higher organisms. Despite their lower concentrations, ergot alkaloids appear to significantly affect animal growth.  Ergots cause changes in normal homeostatic mechanisms in animals that result in toxicity manifested through reduced weight gains, elevated core temperatures, restricted blood flow, reduced milk production and reproductive problems. Peramine, like the ergot alkaloids, is found in much lower concentrations in the host compared with loline alkaloids.  Its activity has been shown to be primarily insecticidal, and has not been linked to toxicity in mammals or other herbivores.

Endophyte infected tall fescue effects on animals

Broodmares and foals

Horses are especially prone to reproductive problems associated with tall fescue, often resulting in death of the foal, mare, or both. Horses which are pregnant may be strongly affected by alkaloids produced by the tall fescue symbiont.  Broodmares that forage on infected fescue may have prolonged gestation, foaling difficulty, thickened placenta, or impaired lactation.  In addition, the foals may be born weakened or dead.  To moderate toxicosis, it is recommended that pregnant mares should be taken off infected tall fescue pasture for 60–90 days before foaling as late gestation problems are most common.

Cattle
Fescue toxicity in cattle appears as roughening of the coat in the summer and intolerance to heat. Cattle that graze on tall fescue are more likely to stay in the shade or wade in the water in hot weather.  In the winter, a condition known as "fescue foot" might afflict cattle.  This results from vasoconstriction of the blood vessels especially in the extremities, and causes a gangrenous condition.  Untreated, the hoof might slough off.  Additionally, cattle may experience decreased weight gains and poor milk production when heavily grazing infected tall fescue pasture.  To deter toxicosis cattle should be given alternative feed to dilute their infected tall fescue intake.

Nutrient pools under tall fescue pasture
Carbon cycling in terrestrial ecosystems is a major focus of research.  Terrestrial carbon sequestration is the process of removing carbon dioxide from the atmosphere via photosynthesis and storing this carbon in either plant or soil carbon pools.  Increases in soil organic carbon help aggregate the soil, increase infiltration, reduce erosion, increase soil fertility, and act as long lived pools of soil carbon. Many studies have suggested that long term endophyte-infected tall fescue plots increase soil carbon storage in the soil by limiting the microbial and macrofaunal activity to break down endophyte infected organic matter input and by increasing inputs of carbon via plant production. While the long term studies tend to show an increase in carbon storage, the short term studies do not.  However, short term studies have shown that the endophyte association results in higher above- and belowground plant biomass production compared to uninfected plants, as well as a decrease in certain microbial communities.  Site-specific characteristics, such as management and climate, need to be further understood to realize the ecological role and potential benefits of tall fescue and the endophyte association as it relates to carbon sequestration.

Novel endophytes
New cultivars are being bred and tested every year.  A major focus of research is producing endophyte-infected tall fescue cultivars that have no detrimental effects to livestock while keeping the endophytic effects of reduced insect herbivory, disease resistance, drought tolerance, and extended growing season.  Novel endophytes, also referred to as "friendly" endophytes, are symbiotic fungi that are associated with tall fescue, but do not produce target alkaloids in toxic concentrations.  A widely used and tested novel endophyte is called MaxQ and is grown in the tall fescue grass host Georgia-Jesup. This cultivar of tall fescue-novel endophyte combination produces ergot alkaloids at near zero levels while maintaining the concentration of other alkaloids.

See also
Phytoremediation plants
Hyperaccumulators table – 3
Invasive grasses of North America

References

Fribourg, H. A., D. B. Hannaway, and C. P. West (ed.). Tall Fescue for the Twenty-first Century. 539 pp.   Agron. Monog. 53. ASA, CSSA, SSSA. Madison, WI.

arundinacea
Bunchgrasses of Europe
Forages
Garden plants of Europe
Lawn grasses
Phytoremediation plants